is a Japanese lightweight rower. Between 1996 and 2012, he competed at five Olympic Games. He won a gold medal at the 2000 World Rowing Championships in Zagreb with the lightweight men's quadruple scull.

References

1973 births
Living people
Japanese male rowers
World Rowing Championships medalists for Japan
Olympic rowers of Japan
Rowers at the 1996 Summer Olympics
Rowers at the 2000 Summer Olympics
Rowers at the 2004 Summer Olympics
Rowers at the 2008 Summer Olympics
Rowers at the 2012 Summer Olympics
Asian Games medalists in rowing
Rowers at the 1998 Asian Games
Rowers at the 2002 Asian Games
Rowers at the 2006 Asian Games
Rowers at the 2010 Asian Games
Asian Games gold medalists for Japan
Asian Games silver medalists for Japan
Medalists at the 1998 Asian Games
Medalists at the 2002 Asian Games
Medalists at the 2006 Asian Games
Medalists at the 2010 Asian Games